Mudhoney is the debut studio album by American grunge band Mudhoney, released in 1989. It was their first LP after several singles and an EP (Superfuzz Bigmuff).

The instrumental song "Magnolia Caboose Babyshit" is a cover of "Magnolia Caboose Babyfinger" by Blue Cheer, but the song is still credited to Mudhoney. The album, when bought as a new vinyl record, is also packaged with a poster of the band (Photo by Michael Lavine). The poster features the band in a blue filter and says "Mudhoney. The album is out." as well as the SubPop and Au Go Go logos.

Track listing
All tracks written by Mudhoney.

 "This Gift" – 3:34
 "Flat Out Fucked" – 2:15
 "Get Into Yours" – 3:50
 "You Got It" – 2:50
 "Magnolia Caboose Babyshit" – 1:07
 "Come to Mind" – 4:52
 "Here Comes Sickness" – 3:41
 "Running Loaded" – 2:50
 "The Farther I Go" – 2:07
 "By Her Own Hand" – 3:16
 "When Tomorrow Hits" – 2:39
 "Dead Love" – 4:27

Personnel
 Mark Arm - guitar, vocals
 Steve Turner - guitar, vocals
 Matt Lukin - bass guitar, vocals
 Dan Peters - drums, vocals

Production personnel
 Jack Endino, Conrad Uno - engineering
 Jane Higgins - album cover design
 Michael Lavine - album cover photography

Charts

References

1989 debut albums
Mudhoney albums
Sub Pop albums